Herpes zoster ophthalmicus (HZO), also known as ophthalmic zoster, is shingles involving the eye or the surrounding area. Common signs include a rash of the forehead with swelling of the eyelid. There may also be eye pain and redness, inflammation of the conjunctiva, cornea or uvea, and sensitivity to light. Fever and tingling of the skin and allodynia near the eye may precede the rash. Complications may include visual impairment, increased pressure within the eye, chronic pain, and stroke.

The underlying mechanism involves a reactivation of the latent varicella zoster virus (VZV) within the trigeminal ganglion supplying the ophthalmic nerve (the first division of the trigeminal nerve). Diagnosis is generally based on signs and symptoms. Alternatively, fluid collected from the rash may be analyzed for VZV DNA using real-time PCR. This test is rapid, easy to perform, and is highly sensitive and specific method for diagnosing this condition.

Treatment is generally with antiviral pills such as acyclovir. Steroid eye drops and drops to dilate the pupil may also be used. The herpes zoster vaccine is recommended for prevention in those over the age of 50. HZO is the second most common manifestation of shingles, the first being involvement of skin of the thorax. Shingles affects up to one half million people in the United States per year, of which 10% to 25% is HZO.

Signs and symptoms

Skin

 Viral prodrome
 Preherpetic neuralgia
 Rash, transitioning from papules to vesicles to pustules to scabs.
 Hutchinson's sign: cutaneous involvement of the tip of the nose, indicating nasociliary nerve involvement.  While a positive Hutchinson's sign increases the likelihood of ocular complications associated with HZO, it's absence does not rule out ophthalmic involvement.
 Disseminated distribution in individuals with immunodeficiency.

Cornea

 Epithelial: punctate epithelial erosions and pseudodendrites: often have anterior stromal infiltrates. Onset 2 to 3 days after the onset of the rash, resolving within 2–3 weeks. Common.
 Stromal:
 Nummular keratitis: have anterior stromal granular deposits. Occurs within 10 days of onset of rash. Uncommon
 Necrotising interstitial keratitis: Characterised by stromal infiltrates, corneal thinning and possibly perforation. Occurs between 3 months and several years after the onset of rash. Rare.
 Disciform Keratitis (Disciform Endotheliitis): a disc of corneal oedema, folds in Descemet's membrane, mild inflammation evident within the anterior chamber and fine keratic precipitates. Chronic. Occurs between 3 months and several years after the onset of the rash. Uncommon.
 Neurotrophic: corneal nerve damage causes a persistent epithelial defect, thinning and even perforation. The cornea becomes susceptible to bacterial and fungal keratitis. Chronic. Late onset. Uncommon.
 Mucous plaques: linear grey elevations loosely adherent to the underlying diseased epithelium/stroma. Chronic. Onset between 3 months and several years after the onset of the rash.

Uveal
Anterior uveitis develops in 40–50% of people with HZO within 2 weeks of the onset of the skin rashes. Typical HZO keratitis at least mild iritis, especially if Hutchinson's sign is positive for the presence of vesicles upon the tip of the nose.

Features:

This non-granulomatous iridocyclitis is associated with:
 Small keratic precipitates
 Mild aqueous flare
 Occasionally haemorrhagic hypopyon
HZO uveitis is associated with complications such as iris atrophy and secondary glaucoma are not uncommon. Complicated cataract may develop in the late stages of the disease.

Anatomy
HZO is due to reactivation of VZV within the trigeminal ganglion. The trigeminal ganglion give rise to the three divisions of cranial nerve V (CN V), namely the ophthalmic nerve, the maxillary nerve, and the mandibular nerve. VZV reactivation in trigeminal ganglion predominantly affects the ophthalmic nerve, for reasons not clearly known. The ophthalmic nerve gives rise to three branches: the supraorbital nerve, the supratrochlear nerve, and the nasociliary nerve. Any combination of these nerves can be affected in HZO, although the most feared complications occur with nasociliary nerve involvement, due to its innervation of the eye. The supraorbital and supratrochlear nerves mainly innervate the skin of the forehead. The frontal nerve is more commonly affected than the nasociliary nerve or lacrimal nerve.

Treatment
Treatment is usually with antivirals such as acyclovir, valacyclovir, or famcyclovir by mouth. There is uncertainty as to the difference in effect between these three antivirals. Antiviral eye drops have not been found to be useful. These medications work best if started within 3 days of the start of the rash.

Cycloplegics prevent synechiae from forming.

References

External links 

Varicella zoster virus-associated diseases
Ophthalmology
Wikipedia medicine articles ready to translate